Nordwestring station is a Nuremberg U-Bahn station. It is the northern terminus of the U3 line and was opened on 22 May 2017.

Location
The station is located on the border of the Nuremberg districts Bielingplatz and Wetzendorf and extends underground in east-west orientation across the Nordwestring (part of B4R) between Bielefelder Straße and Heimerichstraße. The building is located in a simple depth (7.70 m) below the earth's surface. At each platform end there is an elevator, as well as stairs and escalators, which are a direct link to the surface. Behind the underground station, under Bielefelder Straße, there is a 170 m long, double-track tunnel, which is used as a parking or turning facility.

Gallery

References

Nuremberg U-Bahn stations
Railway stations in Germany opened in 2017